Eduardo Di Capua (May 12, 1865 – October 3, 1917) was a Neapolitan composer, singer and songwriter.

Biography 

He was born in Naples in 1865.

He is best known for the song "'O Sole mio". In 1897, di Capua bought a collection of 23 melodies from an obscure composer, Alfredo Mazzucchi. Di Capua developed the piece, and then invited the poet Giovanni Capurro to write lyrics for it. The resulting song has been recorded by many singers, both classical and popular, in both the original Neapolitan and the English adaptation. 

He also wrote "Marie, Ah Marie" ("O Marie" in English), another Neapolitan song.

Eduardo Di Capua died in 1917 in Naples.

References

External links
 
 
 Portrait of di Capua 
 
 Eduardo Di Capua recordings at the Discography of American Historical Recordings.

1865 births
1917 deaths
19th-century Italian composers
19th-century Italian male singers
20th-century Italian composers
20th-century Italian male singers
Italian male composers
Italian male singer-songwriters